The West Enfield Dam, also known as the Stanford Dam, is a hydroelectric dam on the Penobscot River just above its confluence with the Piscataquis River between the towns of Enfield and Howland in Penobscot County, Maine, USA.The dam actually traverses a thin strip of the territory of the Penobscot Indian Island Reservation. The dam has a fish passage. Its power plant has an 11.4 MW installed capacity.

References

Dams in Maine
Buildings and structures in Penobscot County, Maine
Hydroelectric power plants in Maine
Dams completed in 1894